Riverside School District is a public school district in Craighead County, Arkansas. It serves Lake City and Caraway.

History
Riverside School District was created on July 1, 1985, by the consolidation of the Caraway and Lake City school districts.

In October 2009, construction began on a new junior-senior high school building in Lake City, adjacent to the current West Elementary building.

The new High School building's construction finished in late 2011.

Schools
Riverside High School (7-12)
Riverside East Elementary School (PK-6)
Riverside West Elementary School (PK-6)

References

Further reading
These include maps of predecessor districts:
 (Download)

External links
 
 
 
 Riverside High School - Steiling Architecture

Education in Craighead County, Arkansas
School districts in Arkansas
1985 establishments in Arkansas
School districts established in 1985